Passeriniella is a genus of fungi in the class Dothideomycetes and in the Dothideales order. The relationship of this taxon to other taxa within the order is unknown (incertae sedis).

The genus name of Passeriniella is in honour of Giovanni Passerini (1816-1893), who was an Italian botanist and entomologist and also director of the Orto Botanico di Parma. 

The genus was circumscribed by Augusto Napoleone Berlese in Icon. Fungorum vol.1 on page 51 in 1892.

Species
As accepted by GBIF;
 Passeriniella adeana 
 Passeriniella incarcerata 
 Passeriniella mangrovei 
 Passeriniella savoryellopsis

See also 
 List of Dothideomycetes genera incertae sedis

References

External links 
Index Fungorum

Dothideomycetes enigmatic taxa
Dothideomycetes genera